Melissa Munro (born 8 February 1988) is an Australian gymnast. She competed in the team event, where Australia finished 8th, at the 2004 Summer Olympics.

References

External links
 

1988 births
Living people
Australian female artistic gymnasts
Olympic gymnasts of Australia
Gymnasts at the 2004 Summer Olympics
21st-century Australian women